Charles Barber (born 1962) is an American author and Writer in Residence at Wesleyan University who writes narrative nonfiction books.

Education and influences
Barber attended Harvard University, where he studied with and was greatly influenced by the psychiatrist and writer Robert Coles.  After attending graduate school at Columbia University, Barber worked for ten years with the homeless mentally ill in New York City.  He worked in shelters at Bellevue and NewYork-Presbyterian Hospital, and in supportive housing programs.

Writing
In 2005, Barber published Songs from the Black Chair: A Memoir of Mental Interiors, an account of his work with the homeless and also the story of his own experiences with obsessive-compulsive disorder. The New England Journal of Medicine compared the book to William Styron’s Darkness Visible and Sylvia Nasar’s A Beautiful Mind. The title essay of Songs from the Black Chair won a 2006 Pushcart Prize, and material from the book appeared in The New York Times and on National Public Radio.

In 2008, Barber published Comfortably Numb: How Psychiatry is Medicating a Nation, a critique of the over-use of psychiatric medications, particularly antidepressants, to treat and medicate everyday life problems. Comfortably Numb was a Barnes and Noble Discover Great New Writers selection, and was called "a blockbuster" by Library Journal. Salon.com wrote: "Compelling. In Comfortably Numb, Barber brings a street-smart perspective... Offers something several of the other books don't: practical, therapeutic alternatives to antidepressants.”

Barber wrote pieces relating to Comfortably Numb in The Washington Post, Scientific American Mind, and The Nation. In promoting the book, he appeared on Fresh Air and national television. The paperback edition of Comfortably Numb was released by Vintage Books in 2009.

Barber published Citizen Outlaw: One Man's Journey from Gang Leader to Peacekeeper about reformed New Haven gangster William Outlaw in late 2019. Barber and Outlaw appeared on  The Today Show and on C-SPAN's Book TV.

In 2022, Barber published Peace & Health: How a group of small-town activists and college students set out to change healthcare, about the fifty-year history of the Community Health Center and the center's CEO Mark Masselli.

In May 2023, Grand Central Publishing will release Barber's In the Blood: How Two Outsiders Solved a Centuries Old Medical Mystery and took on the U.S. Army.

Lectures and affiliations
Barber has lectured nationally and internationally at colleges, medical schools, and mental health advocacy organizations. He is a Writer in Residence at Wesleyan University and a Lecturer in Psychiatry at the Yale School of Medicine.

Published works
 Peace & Health: How a group of small-town activists and college students set out to change healthcare (Softcover) (Octoberworks, 2005) 
 Citizen Outlaw: One Man's Journey from Gang Leader to Peacekeeper (HarperCollins, 2019) 
 Comfortably Numb: How Psychiatry Is Medicating a Nation (Softcover) (Vintage, 2009) 
 Comfortably Numb: How Psychiatry Is Medicating a Nation (Hardcover) (Pantheon, 2008) 
 Songs from the Black Chair (Softcover) (Bison Books, 2007) 
 Songs from the Black Chair (Hardcover) (Nebraska Press, 2005)

References

Living people
1962 births
American health and wellness writers
Columbia University School of the Arts alumni
Harvard University alumni
Wesleyan University faculty